Fatmir Hysenbelliu (born 4 April 1992, in Tirana) is an Albanian businessman and retired footballer who played as an attacking midfielder.

Career
Fatmir's father  Irfan Hysenbelli, is a businessman.

Early career
Hysenbelli began playing football as a young child in 2001 with Partizani Tirana, before moving to another local team KF Olimpik Tirana in 2003 where he would remain until 2007 when he moved to England. During his time in England he briefly played for both Tottenham and Fulham. He then moved to Italy to sign for AS Bari, where he would go on to captain the youth team. In January 2011 he signed with Genoa but was immediately loaned out to Swiss side FC Lugano, playing for their U21 team but not featuring in any games during his 6-month loan period. He then rejoined AS Bari in the summer and began to train with the first team.

Partizani
Hysenbelliu was training with New York Red Bulls in the United States in order to maintain his fitness following his departure from KF Tirana. Once he returned to Albania he signed a three-year contract with Partizani Tirana on 16 January 2014 and was presented to the media, before joining the club on their winter training camp in Antalya, Turkey.

Teuta
Following his departure from Partizani Tirana Hysenbelliu went on trial to the English League One club Doncaster Rovers, with whom he reportedly agreed terms with the club but problems arose regarding documentation, which paved the way for a move back to Albania with Teuta Durrës. He signed for the club in the closing stages of deadline day on 1 September 2014, and scored in his first game for the club in an internal friendly against the club's under-19 side during the international break. He made his official debut for the club in an Albanian Cup fixture against Besëlidhja Lezhë on 1 October 2014, where he played the full 90 minutes in the 2-0 win. His second and last appearance for the club came in the return leg of the same Albanian Cup fixture against Besëlidhja Lezhë, where he started the game but was substituted off for Vangjel Mile in the 60th minute in the 3-2 win. He left Teuta Durrës on 22 November 2014 without having made a league appearance for the club.

Dinamo
He joined Dinamo Tirana in the Albanian First Division in January 2015 where he was limited to only 6 league appearances due to injury during his time with the 18 time champions. He left the club at the end of the 2014–15 campaign.

Career statistics

Club

References

1992 births
Living people
Footballers from Tirana
Albanian footballers
Association football midfielders
S.S.C. Bari players
KF Tirana players
FK Partizani Tirana players
KF Teuta Durrës players
FK Dinamo Tirana players
Kategoria Superiore players
Kategoria e Parë players
Albanian expatriate footballers
Albanian expatriate sportspeople in Italy
Expatriate footballers in Italy
Albanian expatriate sportspeople in England
Expatriate footballers in England
Albanian expatriate sportspeople in Switzerland
Expatriate footballers in Switzerland